The Honourable John Mahi'ai Kāneakua  (born John Mahi'ai Miller, September 9, 1860-January 26, 1936) was a noble of the non-ruling elite of the Kingdom of Hawaii, an attorney and politician. He was re-elected to the position of County Clerk of Kaua‘i for 28 years until his retirement at the age of 74.

He opposed the provisional government/republic after overthrow by European Americans. He was elected during the territorial period. He supported Queen Lili‘uokalani after the overthrow in 1893 by actively participating in attempts to restore the monarchy. 

He had attended the Royal School, graduating in 1877. He began practicing law in the Kingdom of Hawaii in 1886 and was a member of the Queen's OWN, (part of the volunteer military forces of the Kingdom) from 1886 to 1887.

Early life and education
He was born John Mahiai Miller in Honuaula, Maui to father, Alexander (Alika) P. Miller, son of Mela (Miller) and mother, Kapuailohiawahine Kanuha (Kaialiilii) Miller on October 9, 1860. Kapuailohiawahine Miller, a notable hakumele  (Hawaiian for composer of music) and his sister Isabella Hale'ala Miller taught hula in secret when the dance was banned. He also had a brother, Samuel Kalimahana Miller, born in 1868. and other siblings. He would be hānai adopted by James Kāneakua who, it is believed, had no children of his own.

John attended the Royal school, graduating in 1877 and then began studying law with Edward Preston, working as a clerk for the judge while Preston was still in the legislature of the Hawaiian Kingdom in the House of Nobles. He was admitted to practice law within the Kingdom in 1884, a year before Preston would be named to the Supreme Court of Hawaii. Newspaper ads from the attorney were prevalent in Hawaii where he was considered well known.

Military service and organizations 
The Kingdom of Hawaii's military was divided into several branches with one permanent King's Guard and several volunteer companies including the King's Own, The Queen's Own and the Prince's Own.  John volunteered starting out as a Second Lieutenant of the Queen's Own on October 3, 1885 soon making First Lieutenant of Company A, and serving until 1887.

He helped found the Kamehameha Rifle Association with Robert W. Wilcox, Sam Nowlein, and S. K. Kane and was a member of numerous organizations and associations including the Royal Order of Kamehameha, Kauaʻi Chamber of Commerce, Republican Central Committee, Ka Hale of Nā Aliʻi o Hawaiʻi, and the Kauaʻi Historical Society. He was also a member of Hui Hawaiian Aloha ʻĀina, which opposed the annexation of Hawaii.

After overthrow of the Hawaiian Kingdom

On January 17, 1893, the Kingdom of Hawaii was overthrown in a coup d'état by a militia group known as the Citizen's Committee of Public Safety. As part of the response to the overthrow, the Hui Hawaiian Aloha ʻĀina (Hawaiian Patriotic League) formed a convention of delegates with petitions against annexation and created a committee of members, selected to present a memorial to U.S. Special Commissioner, James Blount during the investigation for what became Blount Report for then President, Grover Cleveland. Kāneakua's name appears last on the list of the 19 committee member signatures. Part of the document read:

Personal life, marriages and death
John married Esther Kamakolu in Kapaʻa, Kauaʻi on July 5, 1903. They adopted two children named Esther Nuihaku and James Neenee. After Esther's death, Kāneakua remarried again at age 64 to Lucy Kaʻumealani Cummings. This union produced 10 children.

Helped translate the Book of Mormon from English to ʻōlelo Hawaiʻi for the Reorganized Church of Jesus Christ of Latter Day Saints in 1898 even though not of that faith.

Kāneakua's home was in Kapaʻa, Kauaʻi. Puaikaena and her husband granted John interest in land in Honomāʻele, Hāna, Maui by deed on May 30, 1900. On January 11, 1901, he was granted additional land in Waiakoa, Kula, Maui by Mrs. Inoaole Ahulii. John died in his home on the island of Kauaʻi on January 26, 1936.

Family tree

References

1860 births
1936 deaths
Hawaiian nobility
Royalty of the Hawaiian Kingdom
Hawaiian Kingdom politicians
People from Kauai
Royal School (Hawaii) alumni
Hawaiian Kingdom military officers
Translators of the Book of Mormon
Nobility of the Americas